Emurena lurida is a moth of the family Erebidae first described by Felder in 1874. It is found in French Guiana, Peru and Bolivia.

References

Phaegopterina
Moths described in 1874